Robert Gilmour (24 October 1831–24 April 1902) was a New Zealand farmer, journalist, newspaper proprietor and editor. He was born in Glasgow, Lanarkshire, Scotland on 24 October 1831.

References

1831 births
1902 deaths
New Zealand farmers
New Zealand journalists
Scottish emigrants to New Zealand
Burials at Eastern Cemetery, Invercargill